Shoal Lake 39 is a First Nations reserve on Shoal Lake straddling the border between Manitoba and Ontario. It is one of the reserves of the Iskatewizaagegan 39 Independent First Nation.

References

External links
 Canada Lands Survey System

Ojibwe reserves in Ontario
Communities in Kenora District
Indian reserves in Manitoba